Pesco Sannita is a comune (municipality) in the Province of Benevento in the Italian region Campania, located about  northeast of Naples and about  north of Benevento.

Pesco Sannita borders the following municipalities: Benevento, Fragneto l'Abate, Fragneto Monforte, Pago Veiano, Pietrelcina, Reino, San Marco dei Cavoti.

References

Cities and towns in Campania